{|

{{Infobox ship career
|Hide header=
|Ship country=Canada
|Ship flag=
|Ship name=Marion
|Ship owner=Frank P. Armstrong
|Ship operator=
|Ship registry=
|Ship route=Inland British Columbia on Columbia River, later Arrow Lakes and Kootenay Lake
|Ship ordered=
|Ship builder=Alexander Watson<ref name = McCurdy>McCurdy, H.W., ed., H.W. McCurdy Marine History of the Pacific Northwest, at 4-5, Superior Publishing, Seattle, WA 1966</ref>
|Ship original cost=
|Ship yard number=
|Ship way number=
|Ship laid down= 
|Ship launched=1888 at Golden, BC
|Ship built=
|Ship christened=
|Ship acquired=
|Ship maiden voyage=
|Ship in service=1888
|Ship out of service=1901
|Ship identification= CAN #94801
|Ship fate=Sank January 1901 at Kaslo, BC
|Ship notes=
}}

|}Marion was a small sternwheel steamboat that operated in several waterways in inland British Columbia from 1888 to 1901.

Design and ConstructionMarion was built at Golden, BC in 1888 for Frank P. Armstrong by Alexander Watson, a shipbuilder from Victoria, BC.  Klahowya's engines were manufactured by Polson Iron Works.One source gives engine dimensions as 5.5" bore by 8" stroke, but the 8" stroke seems too small and may be an error.  See Affleck, at 19  Marion had a deckhouse and a wheelhouse but no passenger cabin.  Passengers simply perched wherever they could on the boat deck.

Operations in Columbia Valley

Capt.  Armstrong operated Marion on the uppermost reach of the Columbia River, which ran from Golden, BC south down the Columbia Valley to the headwaters of the river at Columbia Lake.  Small sternwheelers like Marion played an important role in development by allowing miners, loggers and entrepreneurs to penetrate the region.  They also established the economic viability of steamboat operations in eastern British Columbia, which led to the placement of larger steamers on the routes that the small boats had pioneered.

Transfer to Arrow Lakes
In 1889, Armstrong had Marion shipped by rail on two flat cars to Revelstoke, British Columbia, an important junction where the transcontinental line of the Canadian Pacific Railway made one of its two crossings of the Columbia River.  From Revelstoke, a steamboat could navigate south down the Columbia River to the Arrow Lakes and on the lakes proceed far to the south, near the international border, where spectacular mining discoveries were being made in the late 1880s.  Near the southern end of the lakes was a little settlement called Sproat's Landing.  Armstrong put Marion on the Revelstoke-Sproat's Landing route, running in opposition to the catamaran steamer Despatch, the only other steam vessel then in operation on the Arrow Lakes.

In 1890, Armstrong sold Marion to Capt. Robert Sanderson, who worked the vessel on various routes out of Arrowhead, BC.   (Other sources state it was Sanderson who purchased Marion in 1889 and had her shipped to Revelstoke.)Turner, Robert D., Sternwheelers and Steam Tugs -- An Illustrated History of the Canadian Pacific Railway's British Columbia Lake and River Service, at 2,4, 20, 115, Sono Nis Press, Victoria BC 1984   Marion was used as a low-water vessel.  This was important because at that time the Upper and Lower Arrow Lakes were separated by a shallow stretch of water known as the "narrows".  During certain times of the year such as the later summer, water levels were low in the narrows and also on the Columbia River.  Vessels with a shallow draft such as Marion could continue to use the water routes when vessels requiring deeper water to float in were forced to curtail operations.

Transfer to Kootenay Lake
In 1897, the Kootenay and Arrowhead Railway, a subsidiary of the CPR announced plans to build a rail line along the course of the Lardeau River from Kootenay Lake to Upper Arrow Lake.  The Great Northern Railway also began surveying the same route, with a view towards constructing a completing line on the opposite of the river.

In 1897 Marion was shipped to Kootenay Lake.  Once on Kootenay Lake Marion was operated on the Duncan River which flows into Kootenay Lake from the north.  Marion also provided service to Kootenay Flats at the southern end of Kootenay Lake.

Sinking
In January 1901 Marion sank in a gale while moored at Kaslo, BC.  In 1907 Captain Sanderson broke up the vessel and used her machinery to bore wood pipes at a mill in St. Leon, BC.

Notes

Further reading
 Faber, Jim, Steamer's Wake -- Voyaging down the old marine highways of Puget Sound, British Columbia, and the Columbia River, Enetai Press, Seattle, WA 1985 
 Timmen, Fritz, Blow for the Landing'', 75-78, 134, Caxton Printers, Caldwell, ID 1972 

Paddle steamers of British Columbia
Steamboats of the Columbia River
Steamboats of the Arrow Lakes
Steamboats of Kootenay Lake
Columbia Valley
1888 ships